"Bring Em Out" is a song by American hip hop recording artist T.I., released as the lead single from his third studio album Urban Legend. The song, produced by Swizz Beatz, contains a vocal sample from Jay-Z's "What More Can I Say". This became T.I.'s first US top-ten single, peaking at number nine on the US Billboard Hot 100 chart.

According to Swizz Beatz in a Drink Champs interview, the instrumental was originally made for then-Roc-A-Fella artist, Beanie Sigel, when he was released from prison, but turned it down. Recently in 2020, rapper/podcaster Joe Budden spoke on The Joe Budden Podcast (ep 360) about the beat being for him originally but his management refused to pay for the Jay-Z sample.

Music video
The music video for "Bring Em Out" was directed by Fats Cats and was shot in Atlanta. DJ Drama, Jazze Pha and Swizz Beatz made cameo appearances in the video. It features T.I. on a tour bus as well as him performing on a stage for a crowd of fans. At the end of the video, a brief snippet of "U Don't Know Me" plays.

Use in Media
The song was featured extensively during the 2006 NBA Finals as the theme song for the Miami Heat during player introductions. T.I. performed the song on an episode of The O.C., titled "Return of The Nana". The instrumental version of this song appears on promotions for G4's week-long TV special "Top 100 Video Games of All Time" set to premiere on July 11, 2012.

The song was also used as the entrance theme for the Los Angeles Rams in Super Bowl LIII.

The song appears in 2020 video game Fuser.

Track listing

A-side
1. "Bring 'Em Out [Amended]" 
2. "Bring 'Em Out [Explicit]" 
3. "Bring 'Em Out [Instrumental]"

B-side
1. "U Don't Know Me [Amended]" 
2. "U Don't Know Me [Explicit]" 
3. "U Don't Know Me [Instrumental]"

Charts

Certifications

Release history

References

2004 singles
Grand Hustle Records singles
Song recordings produced by Swizz Beatz
T.I. songs
Songs written by Jay-Z
Songs written by Swizz Beatz
Songs written by T.I.
Songs written by Kenny Gamble
2004 songs